Raymond Gallagher may refer to:

 Raymond F. Gallagher (born 1939), American politician
 Raymond Joseph Gallagher (1912–1991), American Roman Catholic bishop
 Raymond Gallagher (Gaelic footballer)